Bryan Kehl (born June 16, 1984) is a former American football linebacker. He was drafted by the New York Giants in the fourth round of the 2008 NFL Draft. He played college football at Brigham Young University (BYU).

He has also been a member of the St. Louis Rams, Washington Redskins, and Kansas City Chiefs.

Kehl's biological father, Maurice Turner, played in the NFL for four years. Kehl's brother, Billy Turner plays Guard for the Denver Broncos. Kehl's biological mother, Amy Smith, got pregnant in 1984 in college at Utah State, she loved Turner, but marriage was not in their plans. Smith decided to give up Kehl for adoption.

College career
As a freshman Bryan was recruited by Utah, Oregon, Utah State, Harvard, Yale, Penn, BYU, and Idaho State. He eventually decided to play his college ball at Brigham Young University in 2002 while majoring in mechanical engineering and business. He played his freshman year as a reserve right outside linebacker before taking time off from school and football to participate in an LDS Church mission to Toronto for two years. His freshman year, he recorded 14 tackles, 6 of which were solo tackles in 11 games. He also earned the "prep team defensive player of the week award" versus Utah State along with letterman honors. In 2005 when he returned for his second year of college, Bryan played in 11 games as a backup right outside linebacker. He recorded 30 tackles, 15 of which were solo and received letterman honors. Some of these tackles included 4 which were in the Las Vegas Bowl against California. He also blocked a punt that propelled BYU to its only score against Boston College.

In 2006 when Bryan was a junior, he started as BYU's weakside linebacker. This season he was ranked third on the team with 70 total tackles, 30 of which were solo and 8 tackles for a total loss. He also had three sacks, a recovered fumble, and led BYU linebackers during the season with 6 pass break-ups. He was an honorable mention All-Mountain West and Academic All-Mountain West Conference honors recipient. In 2007 as a senior, Kehl received First-team All-Mountain West Conference honors. He was named the team's defensive MVP, one of the captains, and earned the Strength and Conditioning Award. He ended his senior year with a career-high 91 tackles, 52 of which were solo. He put up 11.5 stops behind the line of scrimmage and caused and recovered a fumble during his senior year. He deflected four passes and had an interception in three consecutive games, one of which was returned for a touchdown.

Professional career

Pre-draft

New York Giants
Kehl was selected in the fourth round of the 2008 NFL Draft by the New York Giants.  The Giants traded up (from 130 to 123 overall) by swapping picks with the Pittsburgh Steelers and giving up one of their sixth round picks (194 overall).  He was placed second on the depth chart as weak side linebacker behind Gerris Wilkinson.  Kehl made his first NFL start on October 26 for the injured Gerris Wilkinson when the Giants beat the Steelers in Pittsburgh.  Bryan got his first interception of his NFL career in this game. He picked off Steelers quarterback Ben Roethlisberger and ran it back for 17 yards.

Kehl was waived by the Giants on September 14, 2010.

St. Louis Rams
Kehl was claimed off waivers by the St. Louis Rams on September 15, 2010.

Washington Redskins
On April 23, 2012, Kehl signed with the Washington Redskins. For the team's 3-4 defensive scheme, he switched from an outside linebacker to an inside linebacker to play a backup role to London Fletcher and Perry Riley. Kehl was cut on August 31, 2012, for final cuts before the start of the 2012 season.

Kansas City Chiefs
On October 2, 2012, Kehl was signed by the Chiefs. On November 27, 2012, Kehl was waived by the Chiefs after playing only 3 games for the team.

Second Stint with Redskins
On November 28, 2012, Kehl was claimed off waivers by the Redskins. Set to be a free agent again for the 2013 season, the Redskins re-signed him to another one-year contract on March 14, 2013. In the Week 6 game against the Dallas Cowboys, he tore the ACL in his left knee and was placed on injured reserve the next day.

References

External links
BYU Cougars bio
Washington Redskins bio

1984 births
Living people
Players of American football from Salt Lake City
African-American players of American football
American Mormon missionaries in Canada
American football linebackers
BYU Cougars football players
New York Giants players
St. Louis Rams players
Kansas City Chiefs players
Washington Redskins players
African-American Latter Day Saints
African-American missionaries
Latter Day Saints from Utah